Zhang Anda (born 25 December 1991) is a Chinese professional snooker player, who made his debut on the Main Tour for the 2009–10 season. He qualified by winning the ACBS Asian Under-21 Championship.

Standing at 5 ft. 3 in. tall, he is nicknamed "Mighty Mouse".  Zhang lives in Sheffield, England, during the snooker season and practises at the Victoria Snooker Academy.

Career

2009/2010 season
The 2009–10 season was Zhang's first professional season on the tour. His first match was a 2–5 defeat to Craig Steadman in the first qualifying round of the Shanghai Masters. His first wins came over Ben Woollaston (5–3) and Jin Long (5–2) during qualifying for the Grand Prix. He was then eliminated by Welshman Dominic Dale 0–5.
He also reached the same stage in Welsh Open qualifying having beaten Matthew Couch 5–2 and Mark Joyce 5–4 before losing 2–5 to Marcus Campbell.

Zhang comfortably beat Craig Steadman 10–4 in his first match of World Championship qualifying, scoring his first century of the season in the penultimate frame. He then beat veteran John Parrott 10–6 in the next round. He made a second century, a 113, as he won the last five frames to progress. In the penultimate qualifying round, he beat Andrew Higginson 10–8 in a topsy turvy match. Zhang led 7–3 scoring a 114 in the process before Higginson went ahead 8–7. Zhang took the last three to go through to the final qualifying round. Ricky Walden, provisionally in the top 16 before the tournament, was Zhang's last obstacle to overcome. The first 16 frames were shared before a 134 break in frame 17 and a 103 break in frame 18 for Zhang resulted in a 10–8 victory. This meant that he would be only the fourth Chinese player to play at The Crucible and the lowest ranked player (number 71) to qualify for tournament. He is also one of only a few players to make it to The Crucible in their debut season. This result denied Walden a top 16 place for the following season. Zhang was drawn against seven-time World Snooker champion Stephen Hendry in the first round of the event. Zhang was 0–4 down in the match but rallied to trail only 4–5 after the first session. Hendry increased his lead to 7–5 before Zhang won four frames in a row to be on the cusp of a famous win. He wasted a chance to take the match in the next frame and went on to lose 9–10. Zhang ended the season ranked world number 71.

2010/2011 season
Zhang began the 2010–11 season well by defeating Jak Jones 5–4, Paul Davies 5–1 and Stuart Pettman 5–3 to reach the final qualifying round of the Shanghai Masters. He faced Matthew Stevens and was beaten 2–5. However, he could only win more match in qualifying for the remaining six ranking events, concluding with a 6–10 loss to Andrew Pagett in the first round of World Championship qualifying. He finished the season ranked world number 84, well outside of the top 64 who retain their places on the snooker tour. He therefore entered Q School in an attempt to win back his place and was one match away from doing so in the first event, but lost 1–4 to David Grace. He couldn't qualify from the remaining two events and did not have a place on tour next season.

2011/2012 season
After being relegated off the tour the previous year, Zhang was confined to entering minor-ranking Players Tour Championship during the 2011–12 season. He played in all 12 of them, but had to wait until the final event, the FFB Snooker Open, for his first win which was a 4–1 triumph over Jamie Burnett. Zhang was beaten by the same scoreline by Stephen Maguire in the next round to finish a lowly 115th on the Order of Merit. Zhang lost in the final of the ACBS Asian Snooker Championship 2–5 to Hossein Vafaei, but as Vafaei had already qualified for the main snooker tour, Zhang received a place for the 2012–13 and 2013–14 seasons.

2012/2013 season
Zhang lost in the first round of qualifying for the opening three ranking events of the season. He played in all three of the new minor-ranking Asian Players Tour Championship events, reaching two quarter-finals where he lost to Michael White 3–4 and Li Hang 2–4 respectively. He finished 10th on the Asian Order of Merit, just outside the top eight who qualified for the Finals. His first win in a ranking event match this season was a 6–5 success against Li Yan in International Championship qualifying, but he lost 3–6 to Alfie Burden in the next round. The most matches he could win in qualifying was for the World Open by seeing off Michael Wild 5–3, Luca Brecel 5–4 and Rory McLeod 5–2. He was edged out in the final qualifying round 4–5 by Jamie Cope. Zhang's season came to an end when he lost 5–10 to Michael White in the third round of World Championship qualifying. He finished the year ranked world number 77.

2013/2014 season
Zhang won three consecutive matches 5–4 to qualify for the second ranking event of the season, the Australian Goldfields Open. He beat world number 20 Andrew Higginson 5–1 in the first round to reach the last 16 of a ranking event for the first time in his career, where he was defeated 5–1 by world number two Mark Selby. Zhang also qualified for the Indian Open and beat Alan McManus 4–1 in the first round, before losing 4–3 to Michael White. His best result in the minor-ranking European Tour events came at the Gdynia Open in Poland where he was beaten in the quarter-finals 4–2 by Fergal O'Brien. Zhang was relegated from the main tour at the end of the season as he was placed 77th in the world rankings, outside of the top 64 who remain. In his final game of the first Q School event he made a match-winning break of 54 in the deciding frame against Jamie Clarke to edge it 4–3, having been 3–0 up. The result earned Zhang a fresh two-year main tour card for the 2014–15 and 2015–16 seasons.

2014/2015 season
Zhang played a curtailed schedule of events in the first half of the 2014–15 season. He met Ali Carter, who was playing in his first ranking match since having treatment for lung cancer, in the first round of the UK Championship and came back from 5–3 down to beat him 6–5. Zhang lost 6–5 to Rory McLeod in the second round. He was whitewashed 4–0 by Gary Wilson in the first round of the Welsh Open and narrowly lost 5–4 to Peter Ebdon in the first round of the China Open. Zhang defeated Anthony Hamilton 10–3, Mark Joyce 10–9 and won the last three frames against Liang Wenbo to beat him 10–9 and qualify for the World Championship. The world number 98 was the lowest ranked player to have qualified and in his second appearance in the event he fell 8–1 down to Joe Perry in the opening session. Zhang won the first three frames of the next session which included a 132 break, but Perry went on to complete a 10–4 win.

2015/2016 season
Zhang defeated Liang Wenbo 4–3 to advance to the quarter-finals of the Haining Open, but lost 4–3 to Ding Junhui.
He won his first professional event the General Cup Qualifying Event. He beat Cao Yupeng 5–4 in the final. This was an invitation event with the winner taking the eighth and final place in the General Cup. He would go on to reach the semi-finals of the event, where he was beaten 6–3 by Marco Fu. Zhang overcame Robert Milkins and Dechawat Poomjaeng both 5–4 to qualify for the German Masters and he whitewashed Alfie Burden 5–0 in the opening round to reach the last 16 of a ranking event for the second time in his career. His run was ended with a 5–1 defeat to Judd Trump. Zhang qualified for the World Championship for the second year in a row with wins over Bratislav Krustev, Mark Davis and Zhou Yuelong. He lost 10–5 to Barry Hawkins in the opening round. Zhang was just outside the top 64 in the world rankings at 65, but earned a new two-year tour card by finishing joint fifth on the Asian Tour Order of Merit.

2016/2017 season
Zhang comfortably beat Dominic Dale 5–1 to play in the World Open where he defeated Peter Ebdon 5–1 and Judd Trump 5–2 to reach the last 16 of a ranking event for the third time, but he was thrashed 5–0 by David Gilbert. He got to the same stage of the UK Championship by overcoming Tian Pengfei 6–2, Anthony McGill 6–3 and Mitchell Mann 6–3. Zhang was unable to make it to his first quarter-final as he lost 6–1 to Mark Selby. He qualified for the China Open, but was ousted 5–1 by Mark Williams in the opening round.

2019/2020 season
Zhang remained outside the Top 64 for the entire season with a relatively poor run of form and was unable to replicate prior successes.

2020/2021 season
Owing to his previous poor season, he fell outside of the Top 64 and lost his Tour card. He did not enter the Q School event  as a result of the continuing impacts of the COVID-19 pandemic and was therefore relegated from the professional tour. However, Zhang performed well in the 2021 CBSA China Tour and was awarded a tour card for the 2021–22 and 2022–23 World Snooker Tour seasons as a result.

Personal
Zhang Anda was married in May 2019, but the couple postponed their honeymoon so that Zhang could play in the CBSA Chinese National Championship in Xi'an. Zhang won the tournament, beating Zhao Jianbo 5–3 in the final.

Performance and rankings timeline

Career finals

Non-ranking finals: 2 (1 title)

Team finals: 1

Pro-am finals: 2 (2 titles)

Amateur finals: 3 (1 title)

References

External links

Zhang Anda at worldsnooker.com

Chinese snooker players
People from Shaoguan
Living people
1991 births
Sportspeople from Guangdong
21st-century Chinese people